Banana Ridge may refer to:

Banana Ridge (play), a 1938 play by Ben Travers
Banana Ridge (film), a 1942 film based on the play